The Isle of Wight football team represents the Isle of Wight at the biennial Island Games, which it won in 1995 and 2011. The Isle of Wight is not a member of FIFA or UEFA, it is an island within England and plays under the auspices of the Football Association, the governing body for football in England. The Isle of Wight plays separately in St George's Park which has a capacity of 3,200 and has 200 seats, however the Isle of Wight is divisional FA of The Hampshire Football Association, which is a county FA of the English FA who are part of FIFA and play at Wembley Stadium which has a capacity of 90,000.

Isle of Wight Football Association

The Isle of Wight Football Association was founded in 1898.

Island Games record

Selected Internationals opponents 
Updated as of March 2008

References

External links 
Island Games – Isle of Wight BBC Guernsey, June 2009
Isle of Wight  FEDERACIONES INTERNACIONALES DE FÚTBOL
Island Games Tournament 2003 (Guernsey) Rec.Sport.Soccer Statistics Foundation

National football team
Isle of Wight
Football teams in England